The Bavarian B VII was an experimental locomotive with the Royal Bavarian State Railways (Königlich Bayerische Staatsbahn).

These turf-fired locomotives were the first ones delivered by Krauss to the state railways in Bavaria. They resembled the 0-4-0 vehicles of the Grand Duchy of Oldenburg State Railways (Großherzoglich Oldenburgische Staatseisenbahnen). They were equipped with a water tank frame and Allan valve gear with outside cylinders. They were rebuilt once during its short career, the boiler overpressure being changed. The locomotives, known as the Angry Seven (Böse Sieben) by crews, were retired in 1877 after just 9 years in service.

They were equipped with tenders of the Bavarian class 3 T 6.7.

See also 
Royal Bavarian State Railways
 List of Bavarian locomotives and railbuses

References

External links 
 Railways of Germany forum

0-4-0 locomotives
B 07
Standard gauge locomotives of Germany
Krauss locomotives
Railway locomotives introduced in 1868
B n2 locomotives
Passenger locomotives